Thomas Andrew Archer, M.A.Oxon. (1853, Stoke on Trent – 1905, Headington) was an English historian of the Crusades.

Biography
Archer was baptised on 18 October 1853 in Shelton, Stoke-on-Trent, Staffordshire. He matriculated at the University of Oxford in February 1876 and graduated there B.A. in 1880.

He contributed over 100 articles to the Dictionary of National Biography, 5 articles to the Encyclopædia Britannica, and articles to learned journals such as the English Historical Review. With Charles Lethbridge Kingsford he published in 1894 a book on the Crusades as part of the "History of the Nations" published by T. Fisher Unwin.

References

External links

T. A. Archer and Charles L. Kingsford. The Crusades: The Story of the Latin Kingdom of Jerusalem. G. P. Putnam's Sons, New York & T. Fisher Unwin, London (1894), full text.

1853 births
1905 deaths
Alumni of the University of Oxford
19th-century English historians
People from Shelton, Staffordshire